Frana Marija Vulić Vranković  is Croatian theatre director.

She was educated at the Academy of Dramatic Art, University of Zagreb and is fluent in French, English, German and Spanish. She directs plays and operas for children and adults as well as writes plays for children.  
From 2013 to 2018 she frequently publishes on Arteist.hr.

References

Croatian theatre directors
Living people
Year of birth missing (living people)